Paucartambo (from Quechua: Pawqar Tampu, meaning "colored tambo") is one of six districts of the Paucartambo Province in Peru.

Geography 
Other mountains are listed below:

Ethnic groups 
The people in the district are mainly indigenous citizens of Quechua descent. Quechua is the language which the majority of the population (86.03%) learnt to speak in childhood,  13.71% of the residents started speaking using the Spanish language (2007 Peru Census).

Culture 

The people of the district have an annual festival in honor of their patron saint, Mamacha Carmen. The Virgin Mary is carried in procession through the streets, preceded and followed by traditional dancers of several types, and many festival goers. Traditional dances of the festival include Chukchu, Ch'unchu, Qhapaq negro, Qhapaq Qulla and Saqra.

Subdistricts
 Karaikallo (Karaikallo)
 Paucartambo  (Osorio)

Cantons
 Karaikallo (Karaikallo)
 Paucartambo  (Paucartambo)
 Osorio (Osorio)

References